The Hong Kong Shipping Register was set up in 1990 under the Hong Kong Merchant Shipping (Registration) Ordinance, administered by the Marine Department (Hong Kong). Since the transfer of sovereignty by the United Kingdom in 1997,  Hong Kong is authorised under the Basic Law by the Government of the People’s Republic of China, using the name “Hong Kong, China” to maintain a separate ship registration system.

In April 1999, the Hong Kong Government launched some new measures to improve the ship registration system in Hong Kong. By cooperation of government and shipping industry, the total tonnage of ship registry in Hong Kong has reached over 129 million gross tons with over 2,400 vessels registered in May 2020.

The Hong Kong Ship Register is now the world’s fourth largest ship register, and the world’s largest national flag register.



Ship registry fee 
The first time registration fee for a ship is determined according to its Gross Tonnage (GT).
	

The annual tonnage charge for a ship is determined referring to its Net Tonnage (NT).

The minimum annual tonnage charge is HK$1,500 with every tonne above 1000 NT costing an extra HK$3.5 until 15,000 NT, whereby the rate lowers to HK$3 per tonne thereafter. The charge would not exceed HK$77,500.

Annual Tonnage Charge (ATC) Reduction Scheme 

Since February 2006, the Annual Tonnage Charge (ATC) Reduction Scheme has been enacted to reduce the long term cost for ship owners, whereby, for every two years of the qualifying period, satisfying: 
 given the ship is continuously registered with the Hong Kong Shipping Register;
 given the ship has no detention record under any Port State Control during said period.
The registered ship owner would have the right to enjoy a six months ATC reduction for the following year in general.

Registration procedures 
A ship is eligible for registration if the ship:
 is owned in majority by a qualified person(s), or operated by a qualified person(s) under demise charter,
 is not registered elsewhere,
 has a local representative or agent appointed to it.

There are 3 types of registration: Full Registration, Provisional Registration and Bare Boat Charter Registration. The registration procedures only requires the submission of:

Application Form,
Authority Form for making and signing applications and declarations,
Declaration of entitlement to ensure the ownership of ships.

After a ship is on the Hong Kong shipping register under full or provisional registration, mortgages against the ship can be registered.

Ship registration agents
Agents for HK flag registration include:
 Wealth Ocean Services Ltd.

Preferential port dues 
Hong Kong registered ships can enjoy about 30% preferential port dues in mainland China ports since January 2000. In order to reduce port and light dues for Hong Kong registered ships, HKSAR expects to sign up agreements with other countries which have a two-tier charging system.

Shipping profit taxation
Income derived from the international trade of Hong Kong registered ships is exempted from profits tax. HKSAR has also entered into bilateral double taxation relief agreements with 40 countries which include:

Agreement for the avoidance of double taxation (DTA): 
Denmark, Germany, Netherlands, Norway, Singapore, Sri Lanka, United Kingdom, United States;

Reciprocal tax exemption (RTE): 
Chile, Korea, New Zealand;

Comprehensive DTA (CDTA): 
Austria, Belgium, Brunei, Canada, Czech, France, Guernsey, Hungary, Indonesia, Ireland, Italy, Japan, Jersey, Korea, Kuwait, Liechtenstein, Luxembourg, Mainland China, Malaysia, Malta, Mexico, Netherlands, New Zealand, Portugal, Qatar, Romania, South Africa, Spain, Switzerland, Thailand, United Arab Emirates, United Kingdom, Vietnam

Quality assurance system 
The Flag State Quality Control (FSQC) System is based on an information system to monitor the quality of Hong Kong registered ships. By analyzing and collecting the information, unqualified conditions of a ship will be identified for Flag State inspection.

The Pre-registration Quality Control (PRQC) System involves the Marine Department which will inspect a ship’s condition before it is registered in Hong Kong. The ship should meet all safety and pollution prevention standards announced by International Maritime Organization.

See also
Hong Kong shipping register

References 
Hong Kong Shipping Register User's Handbook, Marine Department of HKSAR

External links
Hong Kong Merchant Shipping Ordinance 

Hong Kong
Water transport in Hong Kong
Ship registration